Ectocion (sometimes Ectocyon) is an extinct genus of placental mammals of the family Phenacodontidae.  The genus was earlier classified as Gidleyina (Simpson 1935) and Prosthecion (Patterson and West 1973)

Paleocene specimens of these hoofed, ground-dwelling herbivores have been found in Canada (Alberta, Saskatchewan) and the United States (Colorado, Montana, North Dakota, and Wyoming).  Eocene specimens have been found in Mexico and the United States (Colorado, Mississippi, Wyoming).

One of the dramatic effects of the Paleocene–Eocene Thermal Maximum (PETM) was some animals evolving smaller bodies.  Fossilized Ectocion jaw bones show that this genus was smaller during (E. parvus, 55.5 mya) the PETM than its relatives before (E. osbornianus, 55.6 mya) and after (E. osbornianus, 55.3 mya) the brief climatic peak period.

References 

Paleogene mammals of North America
Condylarths
Prehistoric placental genera